The United Nations Educational, Scientific and Cultural Organization (UNESCO) World Heritage Sites are places of importance to cultural or natural heritage as described in the UNESCO World Heritage Convention, established in 1972. Vietnam accepted the convention on 19 October 1987, making its natural and cultural sites eligible for inclusion on the list. As of 2021, there are eight World Heritage Sites in Vietnam, including five cultural sites, two natural sites, and one mixed. Vietnam holds the second-highest number of World Heritage Sites in Southeast Asia, after Indonesia with nine sites.

The Complex of Huế Monuments was the first site in Vietnam to be inscribed on the list at the 17th session of the World Heritage Committee held in Colombia in 1993. Two cultural sites from Quảng Nam were listed in 1999: Hội An Ancient Town and Mỹ Sơn Sanctuary. Hạ Long Bay and Phong Nha – Kẻ Bàng National Park were listed as natural sites in 1994 and 2003, respectively, before receiving the extension on the criteria for exceptional geological and geomorphologic values by the World Heritage Committee in 2000 and 2015. The Central Sector of Imperial Citadel of Thăng Long was inscribed in 2010, coinciding with the Millennial Anniversary of the Thăng Long capital. The most recent site added was Tràng An Scenic Landscape Complex in 2016, the first mixed site in Southeast Asia.

After being recognized, the sites became popular tourist attractions. They are also considered to be driving forces behind the growth of tourism in the country. According to the Ministry of Culture, Sports and Tourism, Tràng An was the most popular World Heritage Site in Vietnam, attracted more than 6 million visitors and raised 867.5 million VND in 2019 alone. In addition to its World Heritage Sites, Vietnam also maintains seven properties on its tentative list.

World Heritage Sites 
UNESCO lists sites under ten criteria; each entry must meet at least one of the criteria. Criteria i through vi are cultural, and vii through x are natural.

Tentative list
In addition to the sites inscribed on the World Heritage List, member states can maintain a list of tentative sites that they may consider for nomination. Nominations for the World Heritage List are only accepted if the site was previously listed on the tentative list. , Vietnam has recorded seven sites on its tentative list.

See also

 Protected areas of Vietnam
 List of national parks of Vietnam
 Special National Sites (Vietnam)
 UNESCO Intangible Cultural Heritage Lists
 Members of the Global Geoparks Network
 ASEAN Heritage Parks
 List of Ramsar wetlands of international importance

Notes

References

External links

 UNESCO site

Vietnam

Lists of tourist attractions in Vietnam
Protected areas of Vietnam